Alexander Lugger (born 8 May 1968) is an Austrian ski mountaineer and coach of the national team.

Lugger was born in Lienz. He started ski mountaineering in 1984 and competed first in the Lesachtaler Skitourenlauf race in 1992. He holds several national champion titles amongst others.

Selected results 
 2004:
 5th, World Championship single race
 6th, World Championship combination ranking
 9th, World Championship team race (together with Andreas Ringhofer)
 2005:
 5th, European Championship single race
 10th, European Championship vertical race
 2006:
 6th (and 1st "seniors II" ranking), Patrouille des Glaciers, together with Olivier Nägele and Tony Sbalbi
 2007:
 1st, Scialpinistica del Monte Canin (together with Mario Scanu)
 2008:
 1st, Austrian Championship
 1st, Lesachtaler Skitourenlauf
 1st, Laserzlauf
 5th, World Championship relay (together with Martin Bader, Andreas Kalß and Andreas Fischbacher)
 6th, World Championship long distance race
 7th, World Championship single race

Trofeo Mezzalama 

 2005: 4th, together with Hansjörg Lunger and Olivier Nägele

References

External links 
 Alexander Lugger at skimountaineering.org
 Alexander Lugger , ASKIMO

1968 births
Living people
Austrian male ski mountaineers
Austrian sports coaches
Ski mountaineering coaches
People from Lienz
Sportspeople from Tyrol (state)